Mallickpurhat railway station is located in Dakshin Dinajpur district in the Indian state of West Bengal. It serves Mallikpur, Baul village and the surrounding areas. Mallickpurhat station was built in 2004. A few trains, like the Gour Express, Malda Town–Balurghat passenger trains stop at Mallickpurhat railway station.

References

Railway stations in Dakshin Dinajpur district
Railway stations opened in 2004
Katihar railway division